Grant Maxwell Oppy (born 4 December 1950) is a former Australian rules footballer who played with Richmond in the Victorian Football League (VFL).

Notes

External links 
 
 

Living people
1950 births
Australian rules footballers from Victoria (Australia)
Richmond Football Club players